Murder! is a 1990 video game published by U.S. Gold.

Gameplay
Murder! is a game in which the player is a master detective who solves murder mysteries.

Reception
David Wilson reviewed the game for Computer Gaming World, and stated that while he noted similarities to the board game Clue, he found that "The program is much more complex and sophisticated than that. Even so, the game is quickly learned and, after a short period of time, the mysteries easily solved."

Reviews
Computer and Video Games - Sep, 1990
Zzap! - Sep, 1990
Info - Jan, 1992
The One - Sep, 1990
ACE (Advanced Computer Entertainment) - Oct, 1990
Zero - Oct, 1990
ST Format - Sep, 1990
Amiga User International - Jan, 1991
The Games Machine
Amiga Format
CU Amiga
Amiga Action
Amiga Computing

References

1990 video games
Adventure games
Amiga games
Atari ST games
Detective video games
DOS games
Mystery video games
Video games about crime
Video games developed in the United Kingdom
Video games with isometric graphics